Hector Manuel Laffitte (born April 13, 1934) is a former United States district judge of the United States District Court for the District of Puerto Rico.

Education and career

Born in Ponce, Puerto Rico, Laffitte received a Bachelor of Arts degree from Polytechnic Institute of Puerto Rico (now Interamerican University) in 1955, a Bachelor of Laws from the University of Puerto Rico Law School in 1959, and a Master of Laws from Georgetown University Law Center in 1960. He was in private practice in Puerto Rico from 1960 to 1983.

Federal judicial service

On May 26, 1983, Laffitte was nominated by President Ronald Reagan to a seat on the United States District Court for the District of Puerto Rico vacated by Judge Hernan Gregorio Pesquera. Laffitte was confirmed by the United States Senate on July 26, 1983, and received his commission on July 27, 1983. He served as Chief Judge from 1999 to 2004, assuming senior status on November 15, 2005. Laffitte served in that capacity until his retirement from the bench on February 16, 2007.

See also
List of Hispanic/Latino American jurists

References

Sources
 

1934 births
Living people
Attorneys from Ponce
Georgetown University Law Center alumni
Hispanic and Latino American judges
Judges of the United States District Court for the District of Puerto Rico
United States district court judges appointed by Ronald Reagan
20th-century American judges
Puerto Rican judges